St.Jerome is a Roman Catholic church in Norwalk, Connecticut, part of the  Diocese of Bridgeport.

References

External links 
  St.Jerome - website
 Diocese of Bridgeport

Religious organizations established in 1895
Roman Catholic churches in Norwalk, Connecticut
1895 establishments in Connecticut